Johann Peter Sype (also known as Peter Sype, 11 October 1841 - 20 April 1923) was a private in the United States Army who was awarded the Medal of Honor for gallantry during the American Civil War. He was awarded the medal on 2 September 1911 for actions he performed at the Battle of Vicksburg in 1863.

Personal life 
Sype was born in Monroe County, Michigan in October 1841 to parents Christian and Maria Elizabeth Seip. He married Marie Louisa Doederlein in 1870 and fathered 10 children. He died on 20 April 1923 in Newport, Michigan and was buried in Trinity Lutheran Cemetery in Monroe.

Military service 
On 15 June 1861, Sype enlisted as a private in Adrian, Michigan. As Michigan had filled its recruitment quotas, he was reassigned to Company B of the 47th Ohio Infantry. During the Siege of Vicksburg, on the night of 3 May 1863, Sype volunteered to guard a shipment of goods that was attempting to make its way past the Confederate blockade of the town. After the steamboat he was on was shelled and sunk, he was captured as a Confederate prisoner of war. He was later wounded near Kennesaw Mountain, Georgia in June 1864.

Sype's Medal of Honor citation reads:

Sype was mustered out of service on 10 September 1864 in Atlanta, Georgia. His Medal of Honor is attributed to Michigan.

References 

1841 births
1923 deaths
United States Army Medal of Honor recipients
American Civil War recipients of the Medal of Honor
People from Monroe County, Michigan